Thomas Barber (1894 – 31 December 1936) was an English professional golfer. Although he never won a major tournament, he was runner-up in 1931 Yorkshire Evening News Tournament and twice finished in the top 10 in The Open Championship.

Golf career
Barber qualified for the knock-out stage of the first Yorkshire Evening News Tournament in 1923. He lost to Walter Hagen in the first round. The match went to the 21st hole, at which point Barber stymied Hagen. Hagen, however, holed his chip over Barber's ball to win the match. Barber reached the semi-final of the 1924 News of the World Matchplay at St George's Hill Golf Club, losing to George Gadd by 1 hole. He was runner-up in the 1931 Yorkshire Evening News Tournament at Sand Moor Golf Club, losing in the final to Ernest Whitcombe at the 39th hole.

Death
Barber died on 31 December 1936 in Knokke-Heist, Belgium after an operation. He had been the professional at Royal Zoute Golf Club since July 1935.

Tournament wins
1927 Midland Professional Championship
1932 Midland Professional Championship

Results in major championships

Note: Barber only played in The Open Championship.

CUT = missed the half-way cut
"T" indicates a tie for a place

Team appearances
England–Ireland Professional Match (representing England): 1932 (winners), 1933 (winners)

References

English male golfers
People from Knutsford
1894 births
1936 deaths